European folklore or Western folklore refers to the folklore of the Western world, especially when discussed comparatively.
The history of Christendom during the Early Modern period has resulted in a number of traditions that are shared in many European ethnic and regional cultures.

This concerns notably common traditions based on Christian mythology, i.e. certain commonalities in celebrating Christmas, such as the various Christmas gift-bringers, or customs associated with All Souls' Day.

In addition, there are certain apotropaic gestures or practices found in large parts of the Western world, such as the knocking on wood or the fingers crossed gesture.

History

Many tropes of European folklore can be identified as stemming from the Proto-Indo-European peoples of the Neolithic and Bronze Age, although may originate from even earlier traditions. Examples of this include the ‘Chaoskampf’ myth-archetype as well as possibly the belief in knocking on wood for good luck. The culture of Classical Antiquity, including mythology, Hellenistic religion and magical or cultic practice was very influential on the formative stage of Christianity, and can be found as a substrate in the traditions of all territories formerly colonized by Greeks and the Roman Empire, and by extension in those territories reached by Christianization during the Middle Ages. This includes all of Europe, and much of the Middle East and North Africa. These traditions inherited from folk beliefs in the Roman era were syncretized with local traditions, notably Germanic, Celtic and Slavic.
Many folk traditions also originated by contact with the Islamic world, especially in the Balkans and in the Iberian peninsula, which were ruled by Islamic empires before being re-conquered (in the case of the Balkans, partially) by Christian forces. The result of such cultural contact is visible e.g. in the tradition of the Morris Dance in England, an adaptation of the "moorish" dances of the late medieval period.

The result were the related, but regionally distinct, folk traditions as they existed in European society on the eve of the Early Modern period.
In modern times, and especially since the 19th century, there has been much cross-pollination between these traditions, often by the detour of American folklore.

Regional traditions

Northern Europe
British Folklore
English folklore
Anglo-Saxon paganism
Estonian folklore
Finnish folklore
Lithuanian folklore
Scandinavian folklore
Celtic mythology
Matter of Britain
Irish folklore
Manx folklore
Hebridean mythology and folklore
Scottish folklore
Welsh folklore
Dutch folklore

Western and Southern Europe
Alpine folklore
Spanish folklore
French folklore
German folklore
Modern/Ancient Greek folklore
Portuguese folklore
Italian folklore
Swiss folklore
Folk Catholicism

Central and Eastern Europe
Albanian folklore
Hungarian folklore
Montenegrin folklore
Romanian folklore
Slavic folklore
Polish folklore
Czech folklore
Russian folklore
Ukrainian folklore
Serbian folklore
Bulgarian folklore

See also
Western Folklore
American folklore
Australian folklore
Brazilian folklore
Ethnic groups of Europe
Folk Catholicism
Crypto-paganism
European culture
European mythology

References

Leach, Maria (ed.), Funk & Wagnalls Standard Dictionary of Folklore, Mythology and LegendNew York: Funk & Wagnalls Co, 1949.
Newhall, Venetia J., European Folklore: An Encyclopedia,  Garland Publishing, 2005, .
Ziavras, Mary, "Greek Folk Stories, Old and New:, ComteQ Publishing, 2012, .

External links

"folklore europaea", Festivals-Customs-Traditions in Europe (at Freiburg University)